The Danube Bend is a curve of the Danube in Hungary, close to the town of Visegrád.

Geology 
The present-day U-shaped loop is probably the result of an eruption of the volcano stretching over the whole area some 15 million years ago. The caldera of  Keserűs Hill-volcano, with the associated lava dome formed a later eroded central in the north. The river follows the southern edge of this caldera.

The region

This region is touristically very significant. The landscape and the river attracts a lot of visitors both from the homeland and abroad. The most important towns are Visegrád, Szentendre and Budapest, while on the other (left) bank of the river can be found Vác, Nagymaros and some smaller towns, villages. 
The islands of the region are also interesting, mainly the large Szentendrei-sziget and Margaret Island (Margitsziget) within the capital city.

Gallery

References

See also
 Danube
Geography of Hungary
Iron Gate (Danube)

Danube
Bodies of water of Hungary